Cucullistriga is an extinct genus of insects in the family Idelinellidae. It existed in what is now Russia during the Kungurian age. It was described by D. S. Aristov and A. P. Rasnitsyn in 2012, and the type species is C. cucullata. The body measured about 11.4 millimetres, while the forewings were about 10.8 millimetres.

References

External links
 Cucullistriga at the Paleobiology Database

Prehistoric insect genera
Fossil taxa described in 2012
Fossils of Russia